Urs Amann (25 May 1951 – 7 May 2019) was a Swiss surrealist painter. He is mostly known as the painter of the cover art for several Klaus Schulze records, all in a style reminiscent of Salvador Dalí. He also illustrated the covers of many books, including some by his  brother, Jürg Amann. Urs Amann liked to qualify his work as "meta-realistic painting".

Biography 
Urs Amman was born 1951 in Winterthur. During 1971, in Berlin, he produced his first oil paintings. In 1972, he followed the course of the Form+Farbe art school in Zurich. In 1974, he began his career as a freelance artist, and since 1980, he has been a member of the Winterthur artists group.

Cover art 

Note: some records (Irrlicht, Cyborg, and Picture Music) have been published several times under various covers from other artists.

Klaus Schulze
 Irrlicht (1972)
 Cyborg (1973)
 Blackdance (1974)
 Picture Music (1975)
 Timewind (1975)

Adelbert Von Deyen
  Atmosphere (1980)

Wolfgang Bock
  Cycles (1980)

References

External links 
 Website of Urs Amann

20th-century Swiss painters
20th-century Swiss male artists
Swiss male painters
21st-century Swiss painters
21st-century Swiss male artists
1951 births
2019 deaths
People from Winterthur